Brazil competed at the 2011 World Championships in Athletics from August 27 to September 4 in Daegu, South Korea.

Team selection

The Brazilian team for the competition has been announced. The team will be led by World Indoor Pole
Vault champion Fabiana Murer and Olympic Long Jump champion Maurren Maggi.    The final team on the entry list comprises the names of 31 athletes.

The following athletes appeared on the preliminary Entry List, but not on the Official Start List of the specific event, resulting in total number of 26 competitors:

Medalists
The following competitor from Brazil won a medal at the Championships

Results

Men

Decathlon

Women

Reigning World indoor champion Fabiana Murer won the gold medal in the Women's Pole Vault competition clearing 4.85m in the first attempt equalling her Brazilian and Area record.

See also
Brazil at the World Championships in Athletics

References

External links
Official local organising committee website
Official IAAF competition website

Nations at the 2011 World Championships in Athletics
World Championships in Athletics
2011